Joaquim Alvaro Pereira Leite (born December 8, 1967) is a Brazilian politician who served as Brazil's Environment Minister in the Jair Bolsonaro Government. 

Prior to his appointment, Joaquim Alvaro Pereira Leite was responsible for the Amazon and Environmental Services Secretariat at the  Ministry of the Environment.

References

1975 births
Living people
Brazilian politicians
Brazilian Ministers of the Environment